Iranian film director Abbas Kiarostami won the admiration of audiences and critics worldwide and received more than 70 awards in his career.
These awards are listed below:

 Jury Special Award for The Bread and Alley at the 5th Tehran International Festival of Films for Children and Young Adults, Iran 1970
 First Prize in Narrative Category for The Experience at the 4th Giffoni International Film Festival, Italy 1974
 Jury's Grand Prize for The Traveler at the 9th Tehran International Festival of Films for Children and Young Adults, Iran 1974
 National TV Prize for The Traveler at the 9th Tehran International Festival of Films for Children and Young Adults, Iran 1974
 Special Diploma of Critics for A Wedding Suit at the 11th Tehran International Festival of Films for the Children and Young Adults, Iran 1976
 First Prize for Two Solutions for One Problem at the International Educational Festival of Mexico, 1976
 Diploma of Honor for A Wedding Suit at the 10th Moscow International Film Festival, Soviet Union 1977
 Best Film Award for Case No. 1, Case No. 2 at the Iranian Festival of Films for Children and Young Adults, 1979
 Golden Plaque of Best Short Film for The Chorus at the 2nd Fajr International Film Festival, Tehran 1984
 Jury Special Award for First Graders at the 4th Fajr International Film Festival, Tehran 1986
 Golden Plaque of Best Director for Where Is the Friend's Home? at the 5th Fajr International Film Festival, Tehran 1987
 Jury Special Award for Where Is the Friend's Home? at the 5th Fajr International Film Festival, Tehran 1987
 Bronze Leopard for Where Is the Friend's Home? at the 42nd Locarno International Film Festival, Switzerland 1989
 FIPRESCI Special Mention for Where Is the Friend's Home? at the 42nd Locarno International Film Festival, Switzerland 1989
 Prize of International Confederation of Art Cinemas for Where Is the Friend's Home? at the 42nd Locarno International Film Festival, Switzerland 1989
 Ecumenical Jury's Special Mention for Where Is the Friend's Home? at the 42nd Locarno International Film Festival, Switzerland 1989
 Barclay Jury Prize for Where Is the Friend's Home? at the 42nd Locarno International Film Festival, Switzerland 1989
 Prize of International Confederation of Art Cinemas for Where Is the Friend's Home? at RCC, France, 1989
 Jury Special Prize for Close-Up at the 8th Fajr International Film Festival, Tehran 1990
 Silver R for Close-Up at the 3rd Rimini International Film Festival, Italy 1990
 Best Film Award for Where Is the Friend's Home? at the International Film Festival of the Royal Film Archive of Belgium, 1990
 Prize of Quebec Critics Association for Close-Up at the 19th Montreal International Festival of New Cinema & Video, Canada 1990
 Prize of Best Director for Close-Up at the 5th Dunkerque International Film Festival, France 1991
 Press Prize for Close-Up at the 5th Dunkerque International Film Festival, France 1991
 Prize of the City of Dunkerque for Close-Up at the 5th Dunkerque International Film Festival, France 1991
 Film Students Prize for Close-Up at the 5th Dunkerque International Film Festival,France 1991
 CINEKID Award for Where is the Friend's House? at the 5th Cinekid International Children Film Festival of Amsterdam, The Netherlands 1992
 FIPRESCI Prize for Close-Up at the 11th Istanbul International Film Festival, Turkey 1992
 Prix Roberto Rossellini Award for the Film Career of Abbas Kiarostami at the 45th Cannes International Film Festival, France 1992
 Best Film Award of Un Certain Regard for And Life Goes On at the 45th Cannes International Film Festival. France 1992
 Prix Cine Decouvertes for And Life Goes On from the Association of Belgian Film Distributors, 1992
 François Truffaut Award for Film Career of Abbas Kiarostami at the 23rd Giffoni International Film Festival, Italy 1993
 Prize of City of Rimini for Film Career of Abbas Kiarostami at the 6th Rimini International Film Festival, Italy 1993
 Special award of festival for Film career of Abbas Kiarostami at the 6th Rimini International Film Festival, Italy 1993
 Special Award of Critics for And Life Goes On at the 17th São Paulo International Film Festival, Brazil 1993
 Golden Spike for Film Career of Abbas Kiarostami at the 38th Valladolid International Film Festival, Spain 1993
 Silver Hugo for Through the Olive Trees at the 30th Chicago International Film festival, USA 1994
 Golden Spike for Through the Olive Trees at the 39th Valladolid International Film Festival, Spain 1994
 Special award of Critics for Through the Olive Trees at the 18th São Paulo International Film Festival, Brazil 1994
 Award of Best Director for Through the Olive Trees at the 8th Singapore International Film Festival, 1995
 Golden Rose Award of Best Film for Through the Olive Trees at the 13th Bergamo Film Meeting, Italy 1995
 Best Film Award for Where Is the Friend's Home? at the Rome Summer Film Festival, Italy 1995
 The Third Best Audience Film Prize for Through the Olive Trees at the 44th Melbourne International Film Festival, Australia 1995
 Pier Paolo Pasolini Award for Film Career of Abbas Kiarostami from Pier Paolo Pasolini Foundation, Rome 1995
 Director of the Year, the Variety International Film Guide, 1996
 Officier de la Légion d'honneur from Ministry of Culture and Art of France, 1996
 Palme d'Or for Best Film for Taste of Cherry at the 50th Cannes International Film Festival, France 1997
 Special award of Feast of Cinema for Abbas Kiarostami at the 2nd Feast of Cinema, Tehran 1997
 Special Prize of Festival for Film Career of Abbas Kiarostami at the 27th Giffoni International Film Festival, Italy 1997
 Vittorio De Sica Memorial Award for Film Career of Abbas Kiarostami from Vittorio De Sica Foundation, Italy 1997
 Federico Fellini Gold Medal (UNESCO Special award for Film Career of Abbas Kiarostami from UNESCO, France 1997)
 Taste of Cherry selected as the Best Film of the Year by Time magazine in 1997
 Taste of Cherry selected as the Best Foreign Film of the Year by Society of Film Critics of Boston, USA 1998
 Taste of Cherry selected as the Best Foreign Film of the Year by the National Society of Film Critics, USA 1998
 Special Prize of Masters for Abbas Kiarostami at the 18th Istanbul International Film Festival, Turkey 1999
 Jury Special Prize for The Wind Will Carry Us at the 56th Venice International Film Festival, Italy 1999
 FIPRESCI Award for The Wind Will Carry Us at the 56th Venice International Film Festival, Italy 1999
 The Youth Prize of Future Cinema for The Wind Will Carry Us at the 56th Venice International Film Festival, Italy 1999
 Golden Plaque of Panorama of European Cinema for Film Career of Abbas Kiarostami, Athens, Greece 1999
 Special Prize for Film career of Abbas Kiarostami at the 21st Montpellier International Mediterranean Film Festival, France 1999
 Honorary Golden Alexander Prize for Film Career of Abbas Kiarostami at the 40th Thessaloniki International Film Festival, Greece 1999
 Selected as the Most Outstanding Filmmaker of '90s at the Polling of Cinematheque Ontario, Canada 2000
 Honorary Prize of the 18th Fajr International Film festival for Film Career of Abbas Kiarostami, Tehran, Iran 2000
 The Best Filmmaker of '90s, Film Comment Poll, USA 2000
 Plaque of First Human Rights Declaration of the University of California at Berkeley, USA 2000
 The Golden Dolphin of Kish Island for Lifetime Achievement in Cinema, Iran 2000
 Akira Kurosawa Honorary Award of the 43rd San Francisco International Film Festival, USA 2000
 Special Plaque of Lebanese Ministry of Culture and Art, Lebanon 2000
 Lifetime Achievement for Abbas Kiarostami at the 3rd Beirut Film Festival, Lebanon 2000
 Political Cinema Award of Recanati, Italy 2000
 Honorary doctorate, École Normale Supérieure, 2003
 Konrad Wolf Prize, 2003
 President of the Jury for Caméra d'Or Award, Cannes Festival 2005
 Fellowship of the British Film Institute, 2005
 Gold Leopard of Honor, Locarno film festival, 2005
 Prix Henri-Langlois Prize, 2006
 World's Great Masters, Kolkata International Film Festival, 2007
 Glory to the Filmmaker Award, Venice Film Festival, 2008
 Cup of Jamshid Award, 2008
 Espiga de Oro Largometraje for Certified Copy, Seminci, 2010

References

Cinema of Iran
Awards
Kiarostami